Carposina euphanes is a moth in the Carposinidae family. It was described by John David Bradley in 1956. It is found on Lord Howe Island in the Tasman Sea.

References

Carposinidae genus list at Butterflies and Moths of the World of the Natural History Museum

Carposinidae
Moths described in 1956
Moths of Africa